Lofty may refer to:

Places
 Mount Lofty (disambiguation), several places and associated subjects in Australia

People
 Lofty Blomfield, (1908–1971), New Zealand professional wrestler
 Lofty Drews (born 1940), World Rally Championship co-driver from Kenya
 Lofty England (1911–1995), Jaguar Cars' motorsport manager and later CEO
 Lofty Herman (1907–1987), English first-class cricketer
 Lofty Large (1930–2006), British former Special Air Service soldier and author
 Lofty Wiseman, British former Special Air Service soldier and author

Fictional characters
 Lofty Holloway, a fictional character in the television series EastEnders
 A personified crane in the BBC children's series Bob the Builder
 A fictional character on the 1986 animated television series My Little Pony
 Gunner "Lofty" Sugden, a fictional character on the 1970s British sitcom It Ain't Half Hot Mum
 Ben "Lofty" Chiltern, a fictional character in the television series Casualty and Holby City

See also

 Loft (disambiguation)
 W. J. Loftie (1839–1911), British clergyman and writer
 Lotfi A. Zadeh (born 1921), American mathematician, engineer, and computer scientist
 Lotfi Mansouri (1929–2013), Iranian opera director
 Lotty